Tilford is an unincorporated community located in Meade County, South Dakota, United States. Although Tilford is unincorporated, it has its own ZIP code of 57769.

History
Tilford was platted in 1888. It was named for Colonel Joseph G. Tilford, commander of Fort Meade. A post office was established at Tilford in 1888, and remained in operation until it was discontinued in 1958.

References

Unincorporated communities in Meade County, South Dakota
Unincorporated communities in South Dakota